Amanda Jacobsen Andradóttir (born 18 December 2003) is an Icelandic footballer who plays as a midfielder for Kristianstad and the Iceland national team.

International career
Amanda made her debut for the Iceland national team on 21 September 2021, coming on as a substitute for Gunnhildur Yrsa Jónsdóttir in the match against the Netherlands. Amanda has dual Norwegian nationality and was called up to Norway's under-19 team at one point.

International goals
Scores and results list the Iceland's goal tally first.

Personal life
Amanda's father Andri Sigþórsson was a professional footballer who represented Iceland at international level. Her uncle, Kolbeinn Sigþórsson, was also a professional footballer.

References

External links

 

Andradottir, Amanda
Andradottir, Amanda
Andradottir, Amanda
Icelandic women's footballers
Iceland women's international footballers
Icelandic people of Norwegian descent
FC Nordsjælland (women) players
Vålerenga Fotball Damer players
Elitedivisionen players
Toppserien players
Icelandic expatriate footballers
Expatriate women's footballers in Denmark
Icelandic expatriate sportspeople in Denmark
Andradottir, Amanda